Bartholomew Kemp (fl. 1584–1589), of London, was an English politician.

He was a Member (MP) of the Parliament of England for Shaftesbury in 1584, for Eye in 1586 and for Castle Rising in 1589.

References

Year of birth missing
Year of death missing
Politicians from London
English MPs 1584–1585
English MPs 1586–1587
English MPs 1589